SS Empire Airman was the name of two ships during the Second World War.

 was sunk by U-100 in September 1940.
 was launched in 1941 and became SS San Wenceslao in 1946. She was scrapped in 1959.

Ship names